Persatuan Sepakbola Surabaya ( 'Football Association of Surabaya'), commonly known as Persebaya Surabaya or simply Persebaya, is an Indonesian professional football club based in Surabaya, East Java. It currently plays in the Liga 1, the top flight of Indonesian football. It is regarded as one of the most iconic and successful teams in the country, winning numerous Indonesian League titles and tournaments.

History

Founding & early history

The club was founded on June 18, 1927 under the name Soerabhaisasche Indonesische Voetbal Bond (SIVB). The founders, Paijo and M. Pamoedji, established the club with the intent of housing Indonesian players.

Previously, in 1910, stood Sorabaiasche Voetbal Bond (SVB), but, this club was established to be a representation of the Dutch community living in Surabaya. This club also had close ties with the Dutch East Indies government.

Both of them clearly have different policies. SIVB, which consists of Indonesians, was actively involved in the Indonesian independence movement.

Together with VIJ Jakarta (now Persija), BIVB Bandung (now Persib), MIVB Magelang (now PPSM), MVB Madiun (now PSM), VVB Solo (now Persis), and PSIM, SIVB initiated the formation of the Football Association of Indonesia (PSSI) on April 19, 1930 in Yogyakarta.

PSSI then held Perserikatan, a memberial national football competition, but, the competition was halted in 1943 after the Japanese occupied Indonesia and limited the movement of sports activities and organizations. In 1943, SIVB also changed its name to Persibaya.

Persibaya's sister club, SVB, went on to compete in a competition held by the Nederlandsch Indische Voetbal Bond (NIVB)/Dutch East Indies Football Association. NIVB (later renamed the Netherlands Indische Voetball Unie) did this because the colonial government thought NIVB was no longer able to match the PSSI.

Post-independence era & administration

After Indonesia's independence, the map of football also changed. PSSI is not necessarily the only football federation in the country at the time, after Sukarno plotted Indonesian independence.

During the United Republic of Indonesia (RIS) period, NIVU was still operating. They held the Indonesia State Football Association / Voetbal Union Verenigde Staten van Indonesie competition (ISNIS / VUVSI). The participants were clubs that existed during the Dutch East Indies administration, including VBO Jakarta (VIJ Jakarta / now Persija), VBBO Bandung (now Persib), VSO Semarang (now PSIS) and SVB (Persibaya).

SVB won the competition two times in a row in 1949 and 1950. SVB was one of the strong teams in the ISNIS competition, winning the championship eleven times, only behind VBO Jakarta (now Persija), who won 13 titles.

PSSI then was revitalized after the RIS period ended, which ended on August 17, 1950. Through the PSSI congress on September 2–4, 1950 in Semarang, the federation stated that it would hold the PSSI National Championship.

After the congress PSSI became the sole football federation in Indonesia. This forced the NIVU member clubs to join PSSI. The pattern of the NIVU club is a member of a club affiliated with PSSI. For example, VBO joined as a member of the Persija internal club, then VBBO, UNI Bandung, and Sidolig joined Persib, and this happened at other clubs.

There are special cases for Surabaya. SVB did not directly become an internal member of Persibaya, but merged into it and embraced that the birth date of Persibaya was June 18, 1927, which was the date of the establishment of SIVB. Later, in 1959, Persibaya changed their name to Persebaya.

Four titles In Perserikatan

Post-smelting, Persebaya appeared in the PSSI National Championship which later became known as the Perserikatan. The immediate impact was felt. Persebaya managed to become the champion in the first edition in 1951 after being able to overcome the resistance of PSM, Persija, and PSIM.

The following year they managed to retain the title. This time Bajul Ijo was able to win the competition with Persija, Persis, Persib, PSMS, Persema, and Persipro.

In the 1978 edition of the Perserikatan, the format of the competition changed into a tournament with the champion being determined through the final match. Persebaya was able to bend Persija with a 4-3 score through goals scored by Hadi Ismanto (two goals), Rudy W. Keltjes, and Joko Malis at the Gelora Bung Karno Stadium in Jakarta.

Persebaya again managed to win the final against Persija in the 1988 season, with a final score of 3-2. The match lasted until the extra time round.

In total, Persebaya won the Perserikatan title four times, in 1951, 1952, 1978, and 1988.

Liga Indonesia era

Great achievements were kept awake when PSSI merged Perserikatan and Galatama clubs into a professional league named Liga Indonesia in 1994. Persebaya won the Liga Indonesia Premier Division title in 1996–97. Even Persebaya managed to make history as the first team to win the Liga Indonesia Premier Division twice when in 2004 Green Force won the title again. Although predicated as a classic team laden with titles, Green Force also briefly felt the bitterness of being relegated in 2002. Bitter pills are immediately redeemed with the titles of First Division and Premier Division titles in the next two seasons.

The four Perserikatan titles and two Liga Indonesia titles made Persebaya collect a total of six National titles at the top-tier division of the Indonesian football league system. That number only lost to Persija with a total of eleven championship titles, Persis and Persib with seven titles.

Dualism era 
The 2009/2010 season was the beginning of Persebaya Surabaya's dualism. Persebaya Surabaya (PT Persebaya Indonesia) experienced degradation to the First Division due to being forced to rematch 3 times against Persik Kediri with different places namely in Kediri, Yogyakarta and Palembang. In the third rematch Persebaya refused to do the rematch, the management did not accept and did not want to join the Premier Division and then follow the illegal league "Indonesia Premier League" from the previous name Persebaya Surabaya (PT Surabaya Indonesia) was changed to Persebaya 1927 (PT Persebaya Indonesia).

Utilizing the Persebaya slot in the Premier Division the following season, Wisnu Wardhana took over Persikubar (Kutai Barat) and registered it as Persebaya to enter the Premier Division Competition. Although bearing the official name of Persebaya, the team formed by Wisnu Wardhana did not have a place in the hearts of Bonek (Persebaya supporters), they were more loyal to support the "original" Persebaya who were forced to change their name to Persebaya 1927 due to dualism of competition, and IPL was not recognized as a competition PSSI official.

Persikubar Kutai Barat was taken by Wisnu Wardhana and changed its name to Persebaya Surabaya (now Bhayangkara FC) to be able to join the Liga Indonesia, then successfully promoted to return to the Indonesian Super League in the 2014 season. Then in the 2015 season unfortunately the league was terminated after it was not recognized by the Government and then later Indonesia was banned by FIFA.

In the 2015 season, Persebaya 1927 (PT Persebaya Indonesia) won a patent claim for the Persebaya name and logo, so that automatically the legality of Persebaya Surabaya was under PT. Persebaya Indonesia. This resulted in the Persebaya Surabaya version of Wisnu Wardhana having to change its name to Bonek FC. A year later, Bonek FC again changed its name to Surabaya United at the urging of Bonek who did not want his name to be used for a club that did not represent them (Bonek remained loyal to Persebaya 1927).

In the 2016 season Surabaya United merged with PS Polri and then again changed its name to Bhayangkara Surabaya United and continued until following the Indonesia Soccer Championship competition, in the second half of the competition right in May 2016 the National Police officially bought 100% Bhayangkara Surabaya United shares and deleted the name behind the club so that it is now named Bhayangkara FC, in the same month the results of the Exco meeting held in Solo, Persebaya 1927 was ratified as a member of PSSI and will be ratified at the KLB in Makassar and will again compete in the 2017 Major Division. However, at the PSSI congress which conducted in Jakarta on November 10, 2016 canceled the ratification agenda. The elected PSSI chairman, Edy Rahmayadi, promised to resolve the Persebaya problem at the next congress in Bandung.

Post-dualism/Liga 1 era 
In the 2017 season, Persebaya Surabaya again competed in Liga 2, and success became the champion of the second division by defeating PSMS Medan with extra time in the final which was held at Gelora Bandung Lautan Api Stadium, then promoted to the highest tier, Liga 1. Club's player, Irfan Jaya, became the best player of the season.

In the 2018 season, Persebaya managed to finish at 5th in the final standings of Liga 1. This ranking is quite surprising to the public because they reached it as a promotion team, Persebaya were not expected to penetrate the top 5, as promotion teams were deemed less likely to compete, with some getting relegated back to Liga 2.

In 2019, Persebaya competed in the pre-season tournament President's Cup. They managed to reach the final stage and lost in the Super East Java Derby against Arema aggregately 2–4. Club's forward player, Manuchekhr Dzhalilov became one of three top scorers with 5 goals.

In the end of October 2019, Persebaya appointed their legend as head coach, Aji Santoso, replaced Wolfgang Pikal in the middle of the season. Under his management, he led the club to finish at 5th in 2021–22 season.

Stadium 

Persebaya plays their home matches in Gelora Bung Tomo Stadium, it replaced the older Gelora 10 November Stadium. On 23 July 2012 there has been a friendly match between Persebaya with Queens Park Rangers in Gelora Bung Tomo. On that day the match was won by Queens Park Rangers with a score of 2–1.

Controversy

Matches 
Persebaya had experienced controversial events several times throughout its history. When winning the 1988 Competition, Persebaya played an infamous match dubbed "elephant football" for losing on purpose to Persipura Jayapura 0–12 to eliminate their rival PSIS Semarang which, in the previous year, had shattered Persebaya's dream in the final. These tactics brought results and Persebaya won the Perserikatan in 1988 by beating Persija Jakarta 3–2.

In the 2002 Liga Indonesia Premier Division, Persebaya took action against PKT Bontang, causing them a point deduction. The incident became one of the factors which caused Persebaya's relegation to the First Division. In 2005 Liga Indonesia Premier Division, Persebaya shocked the public when they walked out in the last eight before the third match. The incident caused Persebaya's suspension from football for 2 years. After an appeal, the sentence was reduced to 16 months. However, the PSSI later ruled to only relegate Persebaya to the First Division.

Supporters and rivalries

Supporters 

The supporters of Persebaya are known as Bonek, this name is an acronym from Bondho (resource) and Nekat (reckless). Bonek is one of the biggest supporters in Indonesia.

The song "Song for Pride", is an anthem song Persebaya Surabaya, this song was composed by Mahardika Nurdian Syahputra.

Friendship 
Bonek has a good relationship with Bobotoh, Supporters of Persib Bandung. Their friendship began with their fans who often made headlines as supporters of the rioters.

Rivalries 

The main rivalry with Arema FC is known as the Super East Java derby this match was born from the hostility of the fans and showed the best in East Java, the supporters should not be brought together by the Indonesian Police because of the possibility of clashes between groups.

The match with PSIS Semarang was born from the controversy of Sepakbola Gajah since Perserikatan. Until now the two clubs always compete with high tension when they meet.

Persebaya also has another rival with Persija Jakarta, PSM Makassar, Persib Bandung in the Perserikatan era.

Sponsorship 
The complete sponsors are as follow.

Sponsors
 Kapal Api
 MPM Honda
 Muhammadiyah University
 SURYA
 Tribun Jatim
 Nusa Net
 Extra Joss
 Flashfit
 Philips Old Sponsor
 Agip  Old Sponsor
  Telkom Indonesia  Old Sponsor

Colours and crest 
Amongst Persebaya most popular nicknames are "Bajul Ijo" ('The Green Crocodile'). From the foundation of the club, the common home official kit includes a green shirt, green shorts, with yellow combinations. green and yellow colours are also seen in the crest. The away kit of the club is associated with a white or black background.

Players

Current squad

Out on loan

Management

Corporate hierarchy

Coaching staff

Staff

Head coach history 
Head coach by years (1987–present)

Honours

Asia clubs ranking

Season-by-season records

Past seasons 

Key
 Tms. = Number of teams
 Pos. = Position in league

Performance in AFC competitions 
 Asian Club Championship/AFC Champions League
1997–98 – First round
 2005 – Group stage
 Asian Cup Winners' Cup
 1999–2000 – Second round
 ASEAN Club Championship
2022 – TBA

References

External links 
  
  
 Official Store Persebaya
 

 
Football clubs in Indonesia
Association football clubs established in 1927
Football clubs in East Java
Indonesian Premier Division winners
1927 establishments in the Dutch East Indies
Sport in Surabaya